Carbon farming is a name for a variety of agricultural methods aimed at sequestering atmospheric carbon into the soil and in crop roots, wood and leaves. The aim of carbon farming is to increase the rate at which carbon is sequestered into soil and plant material with the goal of creating a net loss of carbon from the atmosphere. Increasing a soil's organic matter content can aid plant growth, increase total carbon content, improve soil water retention capacity and reduce fertilizer use. Carbon farming is one component of climate smart agriculture.

In addition to agricultural activities, forests management is also a tool that is used in carbon farming. The practice of carbon farming is often done by individual land owners who are given incentive to use and to integrate methods that will sequester carbon through policies created by governments. Carbon farming methods will typically have a cost, meaning farmers and land-owners need a way to profit from the use of carbon farming, thus requiring government programs.

Land management techniques that can be combined with farming include planting/restoring forests, burying biochar produced by anaerobically converted biomass and restoring wetlands (such as marshes and peatlands).

Overview

Soil carbon 
In part, soil carbon is thought to accumulate when decaying organic matter was physically mixed with soil. Small roots die and decay while the plant is alive, depositing carbon below the surface. More recently, the role of living plants has been emphasized where carbon is released as plants grow. Soils can contain up to 5% carbon by weight, including decomposing plant and animal matter and biochar.

About half of soil carbon is found within deep soils. About 90% of this is stabilized by mineral-organic associations.

At least 32 Natural Resource Conservation Service (NRCS) practices improve soil health and sequester carbon, along with important co-benefits: increased water retention, hydrological function, biodiversity and resilience. Approved practices may make farmers eligible for federal funds. Not all carbon farming techniques have been recommended. Carbon farming may consider related issues such as groundwater and surface water degradation.

Related concepts

Climate smart agriculture

Blue carbon

By sector

Agriculture 
Compared to natural vegetation, cropland soils are depleted in soil organic carbon (SOC). When a soil is converted from natural land or semi natural land, such as forests, woodlands, grasslands, steppes and savannas, the SOC content in the soil reduces by about 30–40%. The loss of carbon through agricultural practices can eventually lead to the loss of soil suitable for agriculture. The carbon loss from the soil is due to the removal of plant material containing carbon, via harvesting. When land use changes, soil carbon either increases or decreases. This change continues until the soil reaches a new equilibrium. Deviations from this equilibrium can also be affected by varying climate. The decrease can be counteracted by increasing carbon input. This can be done via several strategies, e.g. leaving harvest residues on the field, using manure or rotating perennial crops. Perennial crops have a larger below ground biomass fraction, which increases the SOC content. Globally, soils are estimated to contain >8,580 gigatons of organic carbon, about ten times the amount in the atmosphere and much more than in vegetation.

Modification of agricultural practices is a recognized method of carbon sequestration as soil can act as an effective carbon sink offsetting as much as 20% of 2010 carbon dioxide emissions annually. Organic farming and earthworms may be able to more than offset the annual carbon excess of 4 Gt/year.

Carbon emission reduction methods in agriculture can be grouped into two categories: reducing and/or displacing emissions and enhancing carbon sequestration. Reductions include increasing the efficiency of farm operations (e.g. more fuel-efficient equipment) and interrupting the natural carbon cycle. Effective techniques (such as the elimination of stubble burning) can negatively impact other environmental concerns (increased herbicide use to control weeds not destroyed by burning).

Biochar/terra preta 

Mixing anaerobically burned biochar into soil sequesters approximately 50% of the carbon in the biomass. Globally up to 12% of the anthropogenic carbon emissions from land use change (0.21 gigatonnes) can be off-set annually in soil, if slash-and-burn is replaced by slash-and-char. Agriculture and forestry wastes could add some 0.16 gigatonnes/year. Biofuel production using modern biomass can produce a bio-char by-product through pyrolysis sequestering 30.6 kg for each gigajoule of energy produced. Soil-sequestered carbon is easily and verifiably measured.

Tilling 
Carbon farming minimizes disruption to soils over the planting/growing/harvest cycle. Tillage is avoided using seed drills or similar techniques. Livestock can trample and/or eat the remains of a harvested field. The reduction or complete halt of tilling will create an increase in the soil carbon concentrations of topsoil. Plowing splits soil aggregates and allows microorganisms to consume their organic compounds. The increased microbial activity releases nutrients, initially boosting yield. Thereafter the loss of structure reduces soil's ability to hold water and resist erosion, thereby reducing yield.

Livestock grazing 

Livestock, like all animals, are net producers of carbon. Ruminants like cows and sheep produce not only CO2, but also methane due to the microbes residing in their digestive system. A small amount of carbon may be sequestered in grassland soils through root exudates and manure. By regularly rotating the herd through multiple paddocks (as often as daily) the paddocks can rest/recover between grazing periods. This pattern produces stable grasslands with significant fodder. Annual grasses have shallower roots and die once they're grazed. Rotational grazing leads to the replacement of annuals by perennials with deeper roots, which can recover after grazing. By contrast, allowing animals to range over a large area for an extended period can destroy the grassland.

Silvopasture involves grazing livestock under tree cover, with trees separated enough to allow adequate sunlight to nourish the grass. For example, a farm in Mexico planted native trees on a paddock spanning . This evolved into a successful organic dairy. The operation became a subsistence farm, earning income from consulting/training others rather than from crop production.

Organic mulch 
Mulching covers the soil around plants with a mulch of wood chips or straw. Alternatively, crop residue can be left in place to enter the soil as it decomposes.

Compost 

Compost sequesters carbon in a stable (not easily accessed) form. Carbon farmers spread it over the soil surface without tilling. A 2013 study found that a single compost application significantly and durably increased grassland carbon storage by 25–70%. The continuation sequestration likely came from increased water-holding and “fertilization” by compost decomposition. Both factors support increased productivity. Methane fluxes were negligible. Soil  emissions from temperate grasslands amended with chemical fertilizers and manures were orders of magnitude higher. Another study found that grasslands treated with .5" of commercial compost began absorbing carbon at an annual rate of nearly 1.5 tons/acre and continued to do so in subsequent years. As of 2018, this study had not been replicated.

Crop type 
Cover crops are fast-growing species planted to protect soils from wind and water erosion during the off-growing season. The cover crop may be incorporated into the soil to increase soil organic matter. Legume cover crops can also produce a small amount of nitrogen. The carbon content of a soil should not be increased without also ensuring that the relative amount of nitrogen also increases to maintain a healthy soil ecosystem.

Perennial crops offer potential to sequester carbon when grown in multilayered systems. One system uses perennial staple crops that grow on trees that are analogs to maize and beans, or vines, palms and herbaceous perennials.

Forestry 
Forestry and agriculture are both land-based human activities that add up to contribute approximately a third of the world's greenhouse gas emissions. There is a large interest in reforestation, but in regards to carbon farming most of that reforestation opportunity will be in small patches with trees being planted by individual land owners in exchange for benefits provided by carbon farming programs. Forestry in Carbon farming can be both reforestation, which is restoring forests to areas that were deforested, and afforestation which would be planting forests in areas that were not historically forested. Not all forests will sequester the same amount of carbon. Carbon sequestration is dependent on several factors which can include forest age, forest type, amount of biodiversity, the management practices the forest is experiences and climate. Biodiversity is often thought to be a side benefit of carbon farming, but in forest ecosystems increased biodiversity can increase the rate of carbon sequestration and can be a tool in carbon farming and not just a side benefit.

Bamboo 
A bamboo forest will store less total carbon than most types of mature forest. However, it can store a similar total amount of carbon as rubber plantations and tree orchards, and can surpass the total carbon stored in agroforests, palm oil plantations, grasslands and shrublands. A bamboo plantation sequesters carbon at a faster rate than a mature forest or a tree plantation. However it has been found that only new plantations or plantations with active management will be sequestering carbon at a faster rate than mature forests. Compared with other fast-growing tree species, bamboo is only superior in its ability to sequester carbon if selectively harvested. Bamboo forests are especially high in potential for carbon sequestration if the cultivated plant material is turned into durable products that keep the carbon in the plant material for a long period because bamboo is both fast growing and regrows strongly following an annual harvest. While bamboo has the ability to store carbon as biomass in cultivated material, more than half of the carbon sequestration from bamboo will be stored as carbon in the soil. Carbon that is sequestered into the soil by bamboo is stored by the rhizomes and roots which is biomass that will remain in the soil after plant material above the soil is harvested and stored long-term. Bamboo can be planted in sub-optimal land unsuitable for cultivating other crops and the benefits would include not only carbon sequestration but improving the quality of the land for future crops and reducing the amount of land subject to deforestation. The use of carbon emission trading is also available to farmers who use bamboo to gain carbon credit in otherwise uncultivated land. Therefore, the farming of bamboo timber may have significant carbon sequestration potential.

Challenges 
Carbon farming is not without its challenges or disadvantages. When ecosystem restoration is used as a form of carbon farming, there can be a lack of knowledge that is disadvantageous in project planning. Ecosystem services are often a side benefit of restoring ecosystems along with carbon farming, but often ecosystem services are ignored in project planning because, unlike carbon sequestration, is not a global commodity that can be traded. If and how carbon farming's additional sequestration methods can affect ecosystem services should be researched to determine how different methods and strategies will impact the value an ecosystem service in particular areas. One concern to note is that if policy and incentives are only aimed towards carbon sequestration, then carbon farming could actually be harmful to ecosystems. Carbon farming could inadvertently cause an increase of land clearing and monocultures when species diversity is not a goal of the landscapes project, so there should be attempts to balance the goals of carbon farming and biodiversity should be attempted.

Critics say that the related regenerative agriculture cannot be adopted enough to matter or that it could lower commodity prices. The impact of increased soil carbon on yield has yet to be settled.

Another criticism says that no-till practices may increase herbicide use, diminishing or eliminating carbon benefits.

Composting is not an NRCS-approved technique and its impacts on native species and greenhouse emissions during production have not been fully resolved. Further, commercial compost supplies are too limited to cover large amounts of land.

By country

Australia
In 2011 Australia started a cap-and-trade program. Farmers who sequester carbon can sell carbon credits to companies in need of carbon offsets. The country's Direct Action Plan states "The single largest opportunity for  emissions reduction in Australia is through bio-sequestration in general, and in particular, the replenishment of our soil carbons." In studies of test plots over 20 years showed increased microbial activity when farmers incorporated organic matter or reduced tillage. Soil carbon levels from 1990 to 2006 declined by 30% on average under continuous cropping. Incorporating organic matter alone was not enough to build soil carbon. Nitrogen, phosphorus and sulphur had to be added as well to do so.

France 
The largest international effort to promote carbon farming is “four per 1,000”, led by France. Its goal is to increase soil carbon by 0.4% per year through agricultural and forestry changes.

North America 
By 2014 more than 75% of Canadian Prairies' cropland had adopted "conservation tillage" and more than 50% had adopted no-till. Twenty-five countries pledged to adopt the practice at the December 2015 Paris climate talks. In California multiple Resource Conservation Districts (RCDs) support local partnerships to develop and implement carbon farming, In 2015 the agency that administers California's carbon-credit exchange began granting credits to farmers who compost grazing lands. In 2016 Chevrolet partnered with the US Department of Agriculture (USDA) to purchase 40,000 carbon credits from ranchers on 11,000 no-till acres. The transaction equates to removing 5,000 cars from the road and was the largest to date in the US. In 2017 multiple US states passed legislation in support of carbon farming and soil health.
 California appropriated $7.5 million as part of its Healthy Soils Program. The objective is to demonstrate that "specific management practices sequester carbon, improve soil health and reduce atmospheric greenhouse gases." The program includes mulching, cover crops, composting, hedgerows and buffer strips. Nearly half of California counties have farmers who are working on carbon-farming.
 Maryland's Healthy Soils Program supports research, education and technical assistance.
 Massachusetts funds education and training to support agriculture that regenerates soil health.
 Hawaii created the Carbon Farming Task Force to develop incentives to increase soil carbon content. A 250-acre demonstration project attempted to produce biofuels from the pongamia tree. Pongamia adds nitrogen to the soil. Similarly, one ranch husbands 2,000 head of cattle on 4,000 acres, using rotational grazing to build soil, store carbon, restore hydrologic function and reduce runoff.

Other states are considering similar programs.

See also 
 Agroforestry
Regenerative agriculture
 Seaweed farming
 Soil carbon feedback

References

External links 
 
COMET-Farm - A tool by USDA which estimates a farm's carbon footprint. Farmers can evaluate various land management scenarios to learn which is the best fit.

 
Agroecology
Sustainable agriculture
Climate change and agriculture